Volodymyr Savovych Mulyava, or Volodymyr Muliava (12 September 1937 – 16 October 2019) was a Ukrainian philosopher, politician who served as an MP. Hetman of the Ukrainian Cossacks.

References

Bibliography 
 A. M. Kolodnyi. Muliava Volodymyr Savovych in Encyclopedia of Modern Ukraine. Kyiv, 2020. Vol. 22. P. 142.

External links
 
   

1937 births
2019 deaths
Ukrainian politicians
Recipients of the Cross of Ivan Mazepa